Sean Hampton (born February 1, 1981) is an American actor, director, and producer.

Born in Ocala, Florida, Hampton is the youngest of five children of a dentist father and a professional model mother. After graduating high school, Hampton enrolled at Stetson University to pursue a career in law. While in school he not only joined Sigma Nu fraternity (Delta Mu chapter), but caught onto acting.  After college he married his current wife Jennifer and the two moved to Los Angeles where they currently reside.

Hampton's first television appearance was on the series Dr. G.:  Medical Examiner (2004). On this series Hampton played real life Orlando Detective Reggie Campbell. Because of a miscommunication, the local police temporarily issued an A.P.B. for Hampton, believing he was impersonating a police officer.  After seeing his image on the news as "Wanted", Hampton's wife called the newsdesk to explain the mixup.  A camera crew was dispatched and the retraction story aired before any serious harm was caused. Since then Hampton has appeared in several other series including: General Hospital, Eleventh Hour, The Young and the Restless, CSI, and more.

In 2009 Hampton took on a dual role as supporting actor and associate producer on the feature film Sandcastles, set to release in 2010. During the same year he worked on the feature films Getting Back to Zero starring Wayne Newton, and The Arcadian, a feature produced by The Fringe Majority LLC.

Hampton's grandmother, Effie Carrie Mitchell-Hampton, was the first licensed female physician in the state of Florida.  She was also one of the founders of the Florida Medical, Dental and Pharmaceutical Association.

In 2012 Hampton co-created a sketch comedy series with producer Matt Getic named The S&M Experience.

Film

Television

Director

Writer

Producer

References

External links
Official website

1981 births
American male film actors
Male actors from Florida
Living people
People from Ocala, Florida